grep is a command-line utility for searching plain-text data sets for lines that match a regular expression. Its name comes from the ed command g/re/p (globally search for a regular expression and print matching lines), which has the same effect. grep was originally developed for the Unix operating system, but later available for all Unix-like systems and some others such as OS-9.

History
Before it was named, grep was a private utility written by Ken Thompson to search files for certain patterns. Doug McIlroy, unaware of its existence, asked Thompson to write such a program. Responding that he would think about such a utility overnight, Thompson actually corrected bugs and made improvements for about an hour on his own program called s (short for "search"). The next day he presented the program to McIlroy, who said it was exactly what he wanted. Thompson's account may explain the belief that grep was written overnight.

Thompson wrote the first version in PDP-11 assembly language to help Lee E. McMahon analyze the text of The Federalist Papers to determine authorship of the individual papers. The ed text editor (also authored by Thompson) had regular expression support but could not be used on such a large amount of text, so Thompson excerpted that code into a standalone tool. He chose the name because in ed, the command g/re/p would print all lines matching a specified pattern. grep was first included in Version 4 Unix. Stating that it is "generally cited as the prototypical software tool", McIlroy credited grep with "irrevocably ingraining" Thompson's tools philosophy in Unix.

Implementations
A variety of grep implementations are available in many operating systems and software development environments. Early variants included egrep and fgrep, introduced in Version 7 Unix. The "egrep" variant supports an extended regular expression syntax added by Alfred Aho after Ken Thompson's original regular expression implementation. The "fgrep" variant searches for any of a list of fixed strings using the Aho–Corasick string matching algorithm. Binaries of these variants exist in modern systems, usually linking to grep or calling grep as a shell script with the appropriate flag added, e.g. exec grep -E "$@". egrep and fgrep, while commonly deployed on POSIX systems, to the point the POSIX specification mentions their widespread existence, are actually not part of POSIX.

Other commands contain the word "grep" to indicate they are search tools, typically ones that rely on regular expression matches. The pgrep utility, for instance, displays the processes whose names match a given regular expression.

In the Perl programming language, grep is the name of the built-in function that finds elements in a list that satisfy a certain property. This higher-order function is typically named filter or where in other languages.

The pcregrep command is an implementation of grep that uses Perl regular expression syntax. Similar functionality can be invoked in the GNU version of grep with the -P flag.

Ports of grep (within Cygwin and GnuWin32, for example) also run under Microsoft Windows. Some versions of Windows feature the similar qgrep or findstr command.

A grep command is also part of ASCII's MSX-DOS2 Tools for MSX-DOS version 2.

The software Adobe InDesign has functions GREP (since CS3 version (2007)), in the find/change dialog box "GREP" tab, and introduced with InDesign CS4 in paragraph styles "GREP styles".

agrep

agrep (approximate grep) matches even when the text only approximately fits the search pattern.

This following invocation finds netmasks in file myfile, but also any other word that can be derived from it, given no more than two substitutions.
 agrep -2 netmasks myfile
This example generates a list of matches with the closest, that is those with the fewest, substitutions listed first. The command flag B means best:
 agrep -B netmasks myfile

Usage as a verb
In December 2003, the Oxford English Dictionary Online added "grep" as both a noun and a verb.

A common verb usage is the phrase "You can't grep dead trees"—meaning one can more easily search through digital media, using tools such as grep, than one could with a hard copy (i.e. one made from "dead trees", which in this context is a dysphemism for paper).

See also

 Boyer–Moore string-search algorithm
 agrep, an approximate string-matching command
 find (Windows) or Findstr, a DOS and Windows command that performs text searches, similar to a simple grep
 find (Unix), a Unix command that finds files by attribute, very different from grep
 List of Unix commands
 vgrep, or "visual grep"
 ngrep, the network grep

References

Notes

 
 Hume, Andrew Grep wars: The strategic search initiative. In Peter Collinson, editor, Proceedings of the EUUG Spring 88 Conference, pages 237–245, Buntingford, UK, 1988. European UNIX User Group.

External links

 GNU Grep official website
 GNU Grep manual
 
 
 "why GNU grep is fast" - implementation details from GNU grep's author.
 Command Grep – 25 practical examples

Unix text processing utilities
Unix SUS2008 utilities
Standard Unix programs
Plan 9 commands
Inferno (operating system) commands
IBM i Qshell commands